Dame Harriette Chick DBE (6 January 1875 – 9 July 1977) was a British microbiologist, protein scientist and nutritionist. She is best remembered for demonstrating the roles of sunlight and cod liver oil in preventing rickets.

Biography

Early life and education
She was born in London, England as the fifth child of seven daughters and four sons of Samuel Chick and Emma Hooley, a Methodist family. Her father owned property and sold lace. The Chick children were brought up strictly with no frivolities and regular attendance at family prayers. All seven girls attended Notting Hill High School, a girls' school thought to be outstanding for its teaching in the sciences. Subsequently, six of the sisters including Harriette continued to study for university degrees. Another of them, Frances Wood, became a notable statistician. Harriette was enrolled at Bedford College, and then as a science student at University College London in 1894 and then proceeded to obtain her doctorate in bacteriology at the same university.

Death 
She died in Cambridge, England in 1977, aged 102.

Work

Early research on sewage disposal and mechanisms of disinfection
During the years 1898–1901 an award from the Royal Commission for the Exhibition of 1851 enabled her to undertake research with Prof Max von Gruber in the Institute for Hygiene in Vienna and with Prof Rubert Boyce in University College, Liverpool. In 1902 she was appointed as assistant to Dr AC Houston, Chief Bacteriologist to the Royal Commission on Sewage Disposal. In 1903 she returned to work with Gruber after his move to Munich in 1902. In 1904 she was awarded a DSc from London University for her work on green algae in polluted waters. In 1905 at the suggestion of Charles Scott Sherrington she applied for the Jenner Memorial Research Studentship at the Lister Institute. Her application raised a number of objections as no woman had been bestowed the fellowship previously. Her relationship with the Lister was long. Employed until 1945 with the institute, she was an honorary staff member thereafter for 25 years.

Chick and Lister Institute director Charles James Martin discovered that the process of protein denaturation was distinct from protein coagulation (or flocculation), beginning the modern understanding of protein folding. She is known for having formulated Chick's Law in 1908, giving the relationship between the kill efficiency of organisms and contact time with a disinfectant. Chick's Law was later modified by H. E. Watson in 1908 to include the coefficient of specific lethality. The Chick-Watson Equation is still used. A new and, at the time, more realistic test for the effectiveness of disinfectants, the Chick-Martin test, was also devised and named for the two collaborators (see Phenol coefficient).

Experience as early woman scientist
In 1909 Chick was a cosignatory to a letter to The Times newspaper from a group of women graduates of the University of London calling for them to be allowed to vote for the Member of Parliament returned by their university. In 1913 she was one of the first three women to be admitted to the Biochemical Society following its renaming and change of policy on the admission of women.

Work at the Lister Institute during and immediately after the First World War: transition to nutritional studies
In 1915, she briefly went to the Lister Institute in Elstree to test and bottle tetanus antitoxin for the army and to develop the first disinfectants aimed at specific microorganisms. She returned to the Chelsea building, however, to prepare agglutinating sera for diagnosis of typhoid and related diseases in troops. Subsequently, however, she commenced studies on rectifying nutritional deficiencies in the wartime diets of both the native population and overseas forces. Initially this involved surveys of the ability of various foodstuffs to counter scurvy and beriberi. In 1919, together with Dr. Elsie Dalyell, she led a team, including Margaret Hume and Hannah Henderson Smith, from the Lister Institute and the Medical Research Council (United Kingdom) to study the relation of nutrition to childhood bone disease in post-war Vienna. They discovered the nutritional factor causing rickets, and proved that fat-soluble vitamins present in cod liver oil, or exposure to ultra violet light, could cure and prevent rickets in children.

Chick was appointed Head of a new nutrition section at the Lister Institute and continued with her research on rickets and, additionally, pellagra. The department was relocated to the Cambridge house of the Lister director CJ Martin during the Second World War.

Honours and distinctions
She served as secretary of the League of Nations health section committee on the physiological bases of nutrition from 1934 to 1937. In 1941 she was a founding member of the Nutrition Society, of which she served as president from 1956 to 1959. She was appointed CBE in 1932 and subsequently Dame of the British Empire in 1949. In 1960 she received an honorary fellowship of the Royal Society of Medicine.
In 1918 she was elected to the Physiological Society. She served as Secretary of the Accessory Food Factors Committee of the Medical Research Council from 1918–1945.

References

1875 births
1977 deaths
British women scientists
British centenarians
Dames Commander of the Order of the British Empire
People educated at Notting Hill & Ealing High School
British nutritionists
British biochemists
Alumni of University College London
Alumni of the University of London
Women centenarians